In American football the air raid offense refers to an offensive scheme popularized by such coaches as Mike Leach, Hal Mumme, Sonny Dykes, and Tony Franklin during their tenures at Iowa Wesleyan University, Valdosta State, Kentucky, Oklahoma, Texas Tech, Louisiana Tech, and Washington State.

The system is designed out of a shotgun formation with four wide receivers and one running back.  The formations are a variation of the run and shoot offense with two outside receivers and two inside slot receivers.  The offense also uses trips formations featuring three wide receivers on one side of the field and a lone single receiver on the other side.

History 

The offense owes much to the influence of BYU head coach LaVell Edwards, who used the splits and several key passing concepts during the 1970s, 1980s, and 1990s while coaching players such as Jim McMahon, Steve Young, Robbie Bosco, and Ty Detmer. Mike Leach has made reference that he and Hal Mumme largely incorporated much of the BYU passing attack into what is now known as the air raid offense. Some of the concepts such as the shallow cross route were incorporated into such offenses as the West Coast offense during the early 1990s as well, prominently under Mike Shanahan while he was the head coach of the Denver Broncos.

The offense first made its appearance when Mumme and Leach took over at Iowa Wesleyan College and Valdosta State University and had success there during the late 1980s and early 1990s. The first exposure into NCAA Division I-A (now FBS) was at the University of Kentucky starting in 1997. There, Mumme and Leach helped turn highly touted QB Tim Couch into a star and later a first overall NFL draft pick. Leach then served as offensive coordinator at the University of Oklahoma in 1999 before landing the head coaching job at Texas Tech. Shortly into the early 2000s, assistant coaches started landing head coaching jobs such as Chris Hatcher at Valdosta State, Art Briles (first at Houston then Baylor), Sonny Dykes (first at Louisiana Tech, then at California), Ruffin McNeill at East Carolina, Dana Holgorsen at West Virginia, and Kevin Sumlin (first at Houston, then Texas A&M). Former Arizona Cardinals head coach Kliff Kingsbury (Mike Leach's first quarterback at Texas Tech) ran the offense as well.

Air raid system 
The scheme is notable for its focus on passing. As many as 65–75% of the calls during a season result in a passing play.  The quarterback has the freedom to audible to any play based on what the defense is showing him at the line of scrimmage.  In at least one instance, as a result of the quarterback's ability to audible, as many as 90% of the run plays called in a season were chosen by audible at the line of scrimmage.

An important element in this offense is the use of no huddle.  The quarterback and the offense race up to the line of scrimmage, diagnose what the defense is showing, and then snap the ball based on the quarterback's play call. The quarterback is responsible for his actions and the play calls most of the time. This not only allows a team to come back if they are many points down as seen in the 2006 Insight Bowl, but it also allows them to tire out the defense, allowing for bigger runs and longer pass completions. The fast pace limits the defense's ability to substitute players and adjust their scheme. The hurried pace can cause defensive mental mistakes such as missed assignments, being out of position or too many men on the field.

Another important aspect of the air raid offense is the split of the offensive linemen.  In a conventional offense, the linemen are bunched together fairly tightly but in an air raid offense, linemen are often split apart about a half to a full yard from another.  While in theory this allows easier blitz lanes, it forces the defensive ends and defensive tackles to run further to reach the quarterback for a sack.  The quick, short passes offset any blitz that may come.  Another advantage is that by forcing the defensive line to widen, it opens up wide passing lanes for the quarterback to throw the ball through with less chance of having his pass knocked down or intercepted.

Fundamental air raid play concepts include Mesh, Stick and Corner, All Curls, 4 Verts, and Fast Screens. These plays are designed to get the ball out of the quarterback's hand quickly, stretch the defense horizontally and vertically, and allow the quarterback to key on one defensive player who will be forced to make a decision on which receiver to cover in his assigned area.  While air raid plays are commonly designed to beat zone coverages, they also work well against man-to-man schemes since air raid offenses often employ receivers with more than average speed, thus giving them an advantage in man-to-man coverage.  

The mesh concept is the bread and butter of the air raid offense and stretches the defense vertically with an outside receiver running a deep route, typically a post route, the running back sliding out into the flat after checking for blocking assignments, and the two remaining receivers running shallow crossing routes that setup a natural pick, or coverage rub.

Coaches 
 Hal Mumme – head coach at Valdosta State 1992–1996, Kentucky 1997–2000, SE Louisiana 2003–2004, New Mexico State 2005–2008, McMurry 2009–2012, and Belhaven 2014-2017; offensive coordinator at SMU 2013.
Mike Leach – offensive coordinator under Mumme at Valdosta State 1992–1996 then Kentucky 1997–1998; offensive coordinator at Oklahoma 1999; head coach at Texas Tech 2000–2009; head coach at Washington State 2012–2019; head coach at Mississippi State 2020-2022.
Mark Mangino – offensive line coach at Oklahoma in 1999 under Leach; offensive coordinator at Oklahoma 2000–2001 after Leach's departure; head coach at Kansas 2002–2009.
Steve Spurrier Jr. – wide receivers coach at Oklahoma in 1999 under Leach and 2000–2001 under Mangino after Leach's departure; offensive assistant at Oklahoma under Riley in 2016; wide receivers coach at Washington State under Leach from 2018–2019; wide receivers coach and passing game coordinator at Mississippi State 2020–present.
 Art Briles – running backs coach at Texas Tech under Leach from 2000–2002; head coach at Houston 2003–2007 and Baylor 2008–2016.
 Ruffin McNeil – at Texas Tech under Leach as linebackers coach 2000–2006 and defensive coordinator 2007–2009; head coach at East Carolina 2010–2015.
 Lincoln Riley – wide receivers coach at Texas Tech from 2007–2009; offensive coordinator at East Carolina from 2010–2014; offensive coordinator from 2015–2017 at Oklahoma; head coach at Oklahoma from 2017–2021. Head coach at University of Southern California 2022–Present.
 Sonny Cumbie – co-offensive coordinator at Texas Tech 2013; co-offensive coordinator at TCU from 2014–2016; offensive coordinator and quarterbacks coach at TCU from 2017–2020; offensive coordinator and quarterbacks coach at Texas Tech from 2021–present.  Played under Leach at Texas Tech.
 Graham Harrell – Offensive coordinator at Purdue University 2022-present; West Virginia University 2022; the University of Southern California 2019–2021; North Texas from 2016–2019. Played under Leach at Texas Tech.
 Seth Littrell – running backs coach at Texas Tech under Leach from 2005–2008; head coach at North Texas from 2016–2022.
 Greg McMackin – defensive coordinator at Texas Tech 2000–2002 under Leach; head coach at Hawaii from 2008–2011.
 Manny Matsakis – special teams coordinator at Texas Tech 2000–2002 under Leach; head coach at Texas State in 2003.
 Clay McGuire – offensive line coach at the University of Southern California; played under Leach at Texas Tech.
 Eric Morris – inside wide receivers coach at Washington State 2012 under Leach; played under Leach at Texas Tech; offensive coordinator at Texas Tech 2013–2017 under Kingsbury. Head coach at Incarnate Word 2018-2021; offensive coordinator at Washington State 2022; head coach at North Texas 2022-present.
 Robert Anae – offensive line coach at Texas Tech 2000–2004 under Leach; offensive coordinator at BYU 2005–2010; OC at BYU 2013–2015; OC at Virginia 2016–2021; OC at Syracuse 2022, OC at NC State (December 2022-Present).
 Josh Heupel – played QB under Leach (1999) and Mangino (2000) at Oklahoma.  Coached quarterbacks at Oklahoma from 2006–2009 before serving as Co-OC from 2010–2014 for Oklahoma. After that, OC at Utah State (2015) and Missouri (2016–2017) before becoming head coach at UCF (2018–2020) and Tennessee (2021-present).
 Kliff Kingsbury – quarterback at Texas Tech 1998–2002, under Leach 2000–2002; offensive coordinator and quarterbacks coach at Houston under Sumlin 2010–2011; offensive coordinator at Texas A&M under Sumlin in 2012; head coach at Texas Tech 2013–2018. Offensive Coordinator at the University of Southern California 2018 (1 month); Head Coach of the Arizona Cardinals 2019–2022.
 Mike Jinks – running backs coach at Texas Tech 2013–2015 under Kingsbury; head coach at Bowling Green 2016–2018.
 
 Tony Franklin – running backs coach at Kentucky 1997–1999, under Leach in 1998; offensive coordinator at Kentucky in 2000; offensive coordinator at Troy in 2006, Auburn 2007–2008, Middle Tennessee 2009, Louisiana Tech 2010–2012, and OC at California 2013–2016.
 Chris Hatcher – quarterbacks and receivers coach at Kentucky under Mumme in 1999; head coach at Valdosta State 2000–2006, Georgia Southern 2007–2009, Murray State 2010–2014, and Samford 2015 present.
 Dana Holgorsen – quarterbacks and wide receivers coach under Mumme at Valdosta State 1993–1995; at Texas Tech under Leach as wide receivers coach 2000–2006 and offensive coordinator in 2007; offensive coordinator and quarterbacks coach at Houston under Kevin Sumlin 2008–2009; offensive coordinator at Oklahoma State in 2010; head coach at West Virginia from 2011–2018; current head coach at the University of Houston.
Jake Spavital – quarterbacks coach under Holgorsen West Virginia 2011–2013; QB coach/offensive coordinator under Sumlin at Texas A&M 2013–2015; and QB coach/offensive coordinator under Dykes 2016; QB coach/offensive coordinator under Holgorsen at West Virginia 2017–2018; and Texas State head coach 2018–present.
 Sonny Dykes – wide receivers coach at Kentucky under Mumme in 1999 and Texas Tech under Leach 2000–2006; offensive coordinator and quarterbacks coach at Arizona 2007–2009; head coach at Louisiana Tech 2010–2012; head coach at California 2013–2016; head coach at SMU 2018–2021; and head coach at TCU 2022-present.
 Mike Gundy – Head coach at Oklahoma State (2005–present)
 Todd Monken – offensive coordinator under Gundy (2011–2012), former head coach at Southern Miss (2013–2015). Current offensive coordinator at Georgia (2020–present)
 Matt Mumme – former head coach at LaGrange College (2013-2016) offensive coordinator at Nevada 2017–2021
 Kevin Sumlin – wide receivers coach at Purdue 1998–2000, offensive coordinator at Texas A&M 2001–2002 and Oklahoma 2006–2007; head coach at Houston 2008–2011, Texas A&M 2012–2017, and Arizona 2018–2020.
 Phil Longo – offensive coordinator at  Wisconsin (2022-present) North Carolina (2019–2022), Ole Miss (2017–2018)

References

External links 
 Culture Crossfire Article covering History/Background of Air Raid Offense
 Highlights of the air raid offense from Texas Tech's 2007 season
 Highlights of the Mesh Route performed by Texas Tech and New Mexico State
 The Shallow Cross Route as performed by Brigham Young in a game

American football strategy